Masty District - a district (rajon) in the Grodno Region of Belarus.

The administrative centre is Masty.

Notable residents 

Piotra Krecheuski (1879, Dubna village – 1928), Belarusian statesman and president of the Rada of the Belarusian Democratic Republic

References 

 
Districts of Grodno Region